Al Mataf is the name of a suburb of Ras Al Khaimah.

References 

Populated places in the Emirate of Ras Al Khaimah